Alimzhan Tursunovich Tokhtakhounov (born 1 January 1949) is a Russian businessman, suspected criminal, and former sportsman. He is accused in relations with organized crime and bribing of figure skating judges in the 2002 Winter Olympics. His nickname is thought to be "Taiwanchik", which refers to his distinctly Asiatic, as opposed to European, facial features. He is wanted by FBI since 2013 for a sophisticated money laundering scheme. As of 2022 he hides from Justice in Russia. United States Department of State listed him as wanted and offered reward for up 4 millions for information leading to his arrest or conviction.

Biography
Tokhtakhounov was born to a Uyghur family in Tashkent, Uzbek SSR, in 1949. In his early years, he was an amateur football player, playing for junior team of Pakhtakor in some seasons. His attempts to continue his career in CSKA Moscow failed and he soon ceased to play. Tokhtakhounov was twice imprisoned: in 1972 and in 1985 for "parasitism".

In 1989, he moved to Germany. He became a citizen of Israel and was allegedly involved with international arms sales with the Western Group of Forces and an Arab country.

In the early 1990s, he settled in Paris, France. There he was soon accused in committing illegal business deals and smuggling of hardware from Germany. He was also reported to have relations with the Russian mafia, including ethnic Georgian mobster Tariel Oniani. After his residence permit in France expired, French authorities refused to renew his residence permit and subsequently he moved to Italy.

In 2002, Tokhtakhounov was accused in bribery of ice skating judges in the 2002 Winter Olympics. He was arrested in Italy by US request, but the Italian court denounced the extradition bid and freed Tokhtakhounov. After he was released from detention in Italy, he moved to Russia.

In Russia, he was investigated about the legality of his Russian citizenship.

He is notably close to professional Russian tennis players. For instance, a 2002 article in the Belgium daily La Libre Belgique reported on interviews of Russian players following Tokhtakhounov's arrest in Italy: Yevgeny Kafelnikov defended his "friend", Marat Safin refused to discuss a topic that was "not his problem", while Anna Kournikova commented "I have heard of this man. But I don't think I should talk about it. I am Russian and I will have to go back there".

The United States has a current arrest warrant out for him on fraud-related charges. In 2010, Alimzhan featured in the 2010 documentary Thieves by Law. He lives openly in Russia.

FBI investigation 
In 2013, Tokhtakhunov was charged with running an illegal gambling ring based in the United States.

According to ABC News, he was caught up in an FBI investigation of "a sophisticated Russian organized crime money-laundering network that operated out of unit 63A in Trump Tower in New York."  According to federal prosecutors, "his is the top of the top of the top in organized crime in Russia."  

The FBI investigation led to a federal grand jury indictment of more than 30 people, including Vadim Trincher, Molly Bloom, Helly Nahmad, and Tokhtakhounov, who escaped arrest and remains a fugitive from American justice. For his support of the illicit operation, Tokhtakhunov allegedly received more than $12 million by the Taiwanchik-Trincher Organization from December 2011 to February 2013.

The U.S. State Department is offering a $4 million reward for Tokhtakhunov's arrest.

Personal
Alimzhan Tokhtakhunov hides in Russia.

Family 
In 2013 he was sued by young 24 years old Yulia Malik with whom he previously had a relationship and fathered 2 daughters. Mrs. Yulia Malik asked the court to return her daughters back from Tokhtakhunov to hear. The court have allegedly sided with her.

Tokhtakhunov has 4 children, one son, and three daughters. the oldest one which is Lola. As of 2019 she was living in the US. His son Dmitry was born out of wedlock. Dmitry had 2 children born in 2019.

See also
 The World's 10 Most Wanted
 Timeline of Russian interference in the 2016 United States elections

Notes

References

External links
 Time magazine on Tokhtakhounov's implication in the Salt Lake City incidents
 CNN: Russian organized crime implicated in skating scandal
 Peoples.ru - Alimzhan Tohtahunov
 In Pictures - World's Top Ten Most Wanted

Fugitives wanted by the United States
Fugitives wanted on organised crime charges
Businesspeople from Tashkent
Russian gangsters
Uzbekistani gangsters
Living people
1949 births
Russian people of Uyghur descent